The Order of Theresa was an order for noble ladies in the Kingdom of Bavaria. It continues to function today as an honorary society to which belong the princesses of the House of Wittelsbach as well as other ladies from Bavarian noble families.

History
The order was founded on 12 December 1827 by Queen Therese of Bavaria, wife of King Ludwig I of Bavaria.  She established an endowment which paid an annual pension to twelve unmarried noble ladies, six of whom received 300 guilders and six of whom received 100 guilders. The pension ceased when a member married; if, however, the marriage was according to the rank of the member, then the lady was permitted to continue to wear the insignia of the order and be known as an Ehrendame (Lady of Honour).

Various other ladies also held the rank of Ehrendame including all the princesses of the House of Wittelsbach. Bavarian ladies paid a reception fee of 55 guilders while foreign ladies paid 220 guilders.

The insignia of the order is worn on the left breast and consists of a blue-enameled Maltese cross with a wide white edge, over which is placed a gold royal crown.  In the four angles of the cross are lozenges with the blue-and-white arms of Bavaria.  At the centre of the cross is a gold bordered white circular medallion decorated with the letter T. On the back of the medallion is the year 1827 and the motto of the order “Unser Leben sey Glaube an das Ewige” (Our life is Faith in Eternity).

The ribbon of the order is white with two sky-blue stripes at the edge, the inner stripe being narrower than the outer stripe. The sash of the order is a similarly coloured broad ribbon, worn diagonally from the right shoulder to the left hip.

Among the current Ladies of Honour of the order is the Hereditary Princess of Liechtenstein.

Recipients

Grand Mistresses
 Queen Therese of Bavaria (1827-1854)
 Queen Marie of Bavaria (1854-1889)
 Princess Ludwig of Bavaria, later Queen Maria Theresia of Bavaria (1889-1919)
 Crown Princess Antonia of Bavaria (until 1954)
 Duchess Maria of Bavaria, first wife of Duke Albrecht of Bavaria (until 1969)

Dames

 Princess Alexandra of Saxe-Altenburg
 Princess Alexandrine of Baden
 Princess Amalie of Saxe-Coburg and Gotha
 Infanta Amalia of Spain
 Amélie of Leuchtenberg
 Princess Antoinette of Saxe-Altenburg
 Princess Augusta of Saxe-Meiningen
 Augusta Victoria of Schleswig-Holstein
 Princess Cecilia of Sweden
 Daisy, Princess of Pless
 Elena of Montenegro
 Elisabeth of Bavaria, Queen of Belgium
 Giovanna of Italy
 Archduchess Gisela of Austria
 Princess Hildegard of Bavaria
 Princess Irmingard of Bavaria
 Isabella II of Spain
 Infanta Isabel, Countess of Girgenti
 Princess Isabella of Croÿ
 Julia, Princess of Battenberg
 Princess Louise d'Orléans
 Princess Louise of Prussia
 Infanta María de la Paz of Spain
 Princess Maria Elisabeth of Bavaria
 Infanta Maria Josepha of Portugal
 Maria Sophie of Bavaria
 Infanta María Teresa of Spain
 Duchess Marie Gabrielle in Bavaria
 Duchess Marie of Mecklenburg-Schwerin
 Empress Shoken
 Duchess Sophie Charlotte in Bavaria
 Princess Sophie of Sweden
 Sophie, Hereditary Princess of Liechtenstein
 Princess Tatiana Alexandrovna Yusupova

Notes

Further reading
 Schreiber, Georg. Die Bayerischen Orden und Ehrenzeichen. München: Prestel, 1964.

External links 

Orders, decorations, and medals of Bavaria
Orders of chivalry of Germany
Orders of chivalry for women
1827 establishments in Bavaria
Awards established in 1827